Damir Crepulja (Damir Tsrepulia) (born January 16, 1984)  is a Georgian professional water polo player. He is currently playing for Georgia men's national water polo team. He is 6 ft 3 in (1.91 m) tall and weighs 245 lb (111 kg).

References

External links 
Damir Crepulja on Instagram

1984 births
Living people
Montenegrin male water polo players
Male water polo players from Georgia (country)